Zdzisław Gierwatowski (March 31, 1920 in Warsaw – May 12, 2005) was a Polish footballer.

Having originated with Polonia Warsaw, he started his career in the 1938-39 season. He was a left-sided defender with one of the most acclaimed playing stances in the Polish game during the 1940s. Serving in active combat in Warsaw during the Second World War, Gierwatowski never regained his form post-1945; he remained in football as a trainer and coach.

1920 births
2005 deaths
Polish footballers
Polonia Warsaw players
Polish football managers
Polonia Warsaw managers
Footballers from Warsaw
Category:Association football defenders]]